Bassanago nielseni is an eel in the family Congridae (conger/garden eels). It was described by Emma Stanislavovna Karmovskaya in 1990, originally under the genus Pseudoxenomystax. It is a marine, deep-water dwelling eel which is known from the central and southern part of the Nazca Ridge, in the southeastern Pacific Ocean. It dwells at a depth range of 160–340 metres. Males can reach a maximum total length of 46.5 centimetres.

The species epithet was given in honour of Jorgen Nielsen, a specialist in the study of deep-sea fish.

References

Congridae
Fish described in 1990